Donna Sheldon is an American politician from the state of Georgia. Sheldon is a former Republican member of Georgia House of Representatives for District 104.

Education 
In 1984, Sheldon earned a degree in Science from Gainesville College.

Career 
Sheldon is a founder and former director of Dacula Classical Academy in Georgia.

On November 5, 2002, Sheldon won the election unopposed and became a Republican member of Georgia House of Representatives for District 71.

On November 2, 2004, Sheldon won the election and became a Republican member of Georgia House of Representatives for District 105. Sheldon defeated John Kenney with 78.36% of the votes.

On November 6, 2012, Sheldon won the election unopposed and became a Republican member of Georgia House of Representatives for District 104.

On August 26, 2013, Sheldon announced her resignation from Georgia House of Representatives to focus on her campaign as a candidate for Georgia's 10th congressional district to replace Paul Broun. On May 20, 2014, Sheldon finished third in the race for Georgia's 10th congressional district after receiving 15% of the vote, as Jody Hice and Mike Collins advanced to a runoff election.

In 2018, as a real estate agent, Sheldon campaigned for a seat in Georgia House of Representatives. On November 6, 2018, Sheldon lost the election for Georgia House of Representatives for District 105. Sheldon was defeated by Donna McLeod and received only 41.63% of the votes.

Personal life 
Sheldon's husband is Bob. They have two children. Sheldon and her family live in Dacula, Georgia.

References

External links 
 Donna Sheldon at ballotpedia.org
 Donna Sheldon at georgialifealliance.com

21st-century American politicians
Living people
Republican Party members of the Georgia House of Representatives
People from Dacula, Georgia
Year of birth missing (living people)
21st-century American women politicians
Candidates in the 2014 United States elections